The 23rd European Men's Artistic Gymnastics Championships were held in Saint Petersburg, Russia from 30 April to 3 May 1998. This event was for male gymnasts in both senior and junior levels.

Medalists

Senior results
Full results of men's senior competition.

Junior results
Full results of men's junior competition.

References

European Artistic Gymnastics Championships
1998 in gymnastics
1998 in European sport
International gymnastics competitions hosted by Russia